Taylors Creek is a stream in Campbell County, Kentucky, in the United States. A variant name is Duck Creek. It is a tributary of the Ohio River. Taylors Creek forms the border between the towns of Bellevue, Kentucky and Newport, Kentucky.

History
Taylors Creek was named for Col. James Taylor, the original owner of the surrounding land.

See also
List of rivers of Kentucky

References

Rivers of Campbell County, Kentucky
Rivers of Kentucky
Tributaries of the Ohio River